The Secret of Two Oceans is a 1956 Soviet drama film directed by Konstantine Pipinashvili.

Plot 
Simultaneously, the Soviet ship "Arctic" and the French ship "Victoire" suddenly die in the Atlantic and Pacific Ocean, respectively. The crew of the Soviet submarine "Pioneer" is going to understand what led to these terrible events.

Cast 
 Sergey Stolyarov as Vorontsov
 Igor Vladimirov as Skvoreshnya
 Sergei Golovanov as Gorelov
 Pyotr Sobolevsky as Druzhinin
 Vakhtang Ninua as Lortkipanidze
 Sergey Komarov as Professor
 Antonina Maksimova as Bystrykh
 Leonid Pirogov as Bistrikh
 Troadiy Dobrotvorskiy as Bazov (as T. Dobrotvorsky)
 Pavel Luspekayev as Kartsev
 Mikhail Gluzskiy as Ivashev
 Irina Preys as Sidorina (as I. Preys)
 Igor Bristol as Pavlik

References

External links 
 

1956 films
1950s Russian-language films
1956 drama films
Soviet drama films